Scott Tanser (born 23 October 1994) is an English professional footballer who plays as a left-back for Scottish Premiership club St Mirren.

He made his senior debut for Rochdale in April 2013, and made a total of 57 league and cup appearances for the club before he was allowed to leave for Port Vale in January 2017. He joined Scottish Premiership club St Johnstone five months later. He won the Scottish Cup and Scottish League Cup with St Johnstone in the 2020–21 season. He joined St Mirren in June 2021.

Career

Rochdale
Tanser spent time in the youth teams at Blackpool and Burnley, before coming through the Rochdale Academy. He made his professional debut for the "Dale" after coming on as a 70th-minute substitute for D'Arcy O'Connor in a 1–0 victory over Plymouth Argyle at Spotland Stadium on 27 April 2013. This was his only appearance of the 2012–13 season and he did not feature in the 2013–14 campaign as Rochdale secured promotion out of League Two. He broke into the first team at the start of the 2014–15 season, and signed a two-year contract extension in October 2014. Speaking the following month, manager Keith Hill said that Tanser was good enough to win England youth caps but that "politics in football, the bureaucracy and the propaganda" prevented lower league players from receiving a call-up. Tanser scored his first goal in senior football on 17 January 2015, opening the scoring with a "well-controlled, left-foot volley" as Rochdale recorded a 4–1 home victory over Crawley Town; he was named on the Football League team of the week. He ended the season with 30 League One appearances to his name.

He scored his second career goal on his first appearance of the 2015–16 season, as Rochdale beat Chesterfield 2–1 in the Football League Trophy on 6 October. He maintained a first team place and played ten further games before falling out of the first team picture completely; his appearance against Bury on 6 December proved to be his last of the season. He played just five league games in the first half of the 2016–17 campaign and his contract was cancelled by mutual consent in January 2017 to allow him to find first team football elsewhere.

Port Vale
Tanser signed a contract with League One rivals Port Vale on 27 January 2017 to run until the end of the 2016–17 season. Tanser said that the move "was a bit of a shock actually... one minute I am at Rochdale then the next minute I am signing for Port Vale. It is a bit mad really but that is the way that football is." He was released by manager Michael Brown following the club's relegation in May 2017.

St Johnstone
Tanser signed a one-year contract with Scottish Premiership club St Johnstone in June 2017. Speaking the following March he stated that "This is the best club I have been at and I have loved it this season... everyone is together here, there are no outcasts in our squad". He made 31 appearances for Tommy Wright's "Saints" during the 2017–18 season as St Johnstone posted an eighth-placed finish. In the summer he told The Courier that he was bulking up to gain greater strength and physicality, saying he was "on a special diet, total protein and six meals a day. So I'm going to be throwing chicken, beef and all sorts of stuff down my neck soon. It's just as well I'm not a vegetarian!"

On 29 December 2018, Tanser scored his first goal for St Johnstone in their 2–0 win over Tayside rivals, Dundee. He signed a new two-year contract extension at the club the following month. He ended the 2018–19 season with 45 appearances to his name, as well as three goals as he scored a penalty in the penultimate game against Motherwell. Speaking in September 2019, Wright said of Tanser that "he is quickly becoming a top class full-back and for me he can go on to become one of the top three or four in the country". Tanser featured in 27 matches of the 2019–20 season, which was curtailed early due to the COVID-19 pandemic in Scotland.

He won the Scottish League Cup with St Johnstone in 2021, though was an unused substitute in the final as they beat Livingston at Hampden Park. St Johnstone went on to complete a cup double by lifting the Scottish Cup with a 1–0 victory over Hibernian, with Tanser again an unused substitute. However he struggled with injuries towards the end of the 2020–21 season and was linked with moves away from the club, despite manager Callum Davidson being keen to keep hold of him. He was linked with a number of clubs in England's League One.

St Mirren
On 7 June 2021, Tanser signed a one-year contract with Scottish Premiership club St Mirren, with an option for a further year. He established himself as a popular player at St Mirren Park for what the Daily Record called his "marauding runs down the left flank and his wicked deliveries into the box" and kept his first-team place after Jim Goodwin's departure in February. He signed a two-year contract extension with the club in May 2022. Manager Stephen Robinson commented that Tanser was "one of the best left-backs in this league".

Career statistics

Honours
St Johnstone
Scottish Cup: 2020–21
Scottish League Cup: 2020–21

References

1994 births
Living people
English people of Scottish descent
Sportspeople from Blackpool
English footballers
Association football fullbacks
Blackpool F.C. players
Burnley F.C. players
Rochdale A.F.C. players
Port Vale F.C. players
St Johnstone F.C. players
St Mirren F.C. players
English Football League players
Scottish Professional Football League players